Rolling Home may refer to:

 Rolling Home (1926 film), an American silent film comedy
 Rolling Home (1935 film), a British comedy film
 Rolling Home (1946 film), an American film directed by William Berke
 Rolling Home: A Cross Canada Railroad Memoir, a 2001 memoir by Tom Allen 
 "Rolling Home" (song), a 1995 song by Rednex
 "Rolling Home", an 1870s sea shanty about Hamburg
 "Rolling Home", a 1967 song by Peter, Paul & Mary from Album 1700
 "Rolling Home", a 1976 song by Status Quo from Blue for You
 "Rollin' Home", a 1986 song by Status Quo from In the Army Now
 "Rollin' Home", a 1934 song by the Charlie Davis Orchestra